Johannes Ilmari Tossavainen (25 July 1887, Keitele - 26 January 1978) was a Finnish cooperative manager and politician. He was a member of the Parliament of Finland from 1913 to 1916, representing the Social Democratic Party of Finland (SDP).

References

1887 births
1978 deaths
People from Keitele
People from Kuopio Province (Grand Duchy of Finland)
Social Democratic Party of Finland politicians
Members of the Parliament of Finland (1913–16)